A municipal election was held in Gatineau, Quebec, Canada on November 5, 2017 in conjunction with 2017 Quebec municipal elections across the province on that date. Elections were held for Mayor of Gatineau as well as for each of the 18 districts on Gatineau City Council.

Mayoral race

Opinion polls

Aylmer District

Lucerne District

Deschênes District

Plateau District

Manoir-des-Trembles-Val-Tétreau District

l'Orée-du-Parc District

Parc-de-la-Montagne-Saint-Raymond District

Hull-Wright District

Limbour District

Touraine District

Pointe-Gatineau District

Carrefour-de-l'Hôpital District

Versant District

Bellevue District

Lac-Beauchamp District

Rivière-Blanche District

Masson-Angers District

Buckingham District

References

External links
Candidates

2017 Quebec municipal elections
2017